Tianning may refer to the following locations in China:

Tianning District (天宁区), Changzhou, Jiangsu
Tianning Temple (disambiguation) (天宁寺), two temples
Tianning, Jiaocheng County (天宁镇), town and county seat of Jiaocheng County, Shanxi
Tianning, Jiashan County (天凝镇), town in Jiashan County, Zhejiang